Dushmani may refer to:
Dushmani (region)
Dushmani (tribe)
Dushmani family
Dushmani (film)
Dushmani: A Violent Love Story, a 1996 Bollywood film